The Deliberate Stranger is a book about American serial killer Ted Bundy written by Seattle Times reporter Richard W. Larsen that was published in 1980. The book spawned a television miniseries of the same title, starring Mark Harmon as Bundy, that aired on NBC on May 4–5, 1986.

Book 
Bundy: The Deliberate Stranger was written by Seattle Times reporter Richard W. Larsen and published in 1980. Larsen covered politics for the Times and had interviewed Bundy in 1972, several years before he became a murder suspect, when Bundy worked as a volunteer for the re-election campaign of Gov. Daniel J. Evans and had been seen trailing the campaign of Evans' Democratic opponent with a video camera.

Larsen would go on to cover the "Ted" murders in 1974, when Bundy was first identified as a suspect in Seattle area homicides, and then cover the Ted Bundy story up until Bundy's execution in 1989. Bundy: The Deliberate Stranger was published in paperback in editions as late as 1990 but has since gone out of print.

Television miniseries 
The Deliberate Stranger was adapted into a two-part television movie originally broadcast on NBC on May 4 and 5, 1986. The film, based on Larsen's book, starred Mark Harmon as Bundy. Parts of the film were shot in Salt Lake City and at Utah State Prison as well as Farmington, Utah and Seattle, Washington.

The film omits Bundy's childhood, early life, and first six known victims (five murders and the first victim who survived), picking up the story with the murder of Georgann Hawkins and following Bundy's further crimes in Washington, Utah, Colorado and Florida. Frederic Forrest starred as Seattle detective Robert D. Keppel, and George Grizzard played reporter Larsen.

Cast
 Mark Harmon as Ted Bundy
 Frederic Forrest as Detective Bob Keppel
 George Grizzard as Richard Larsen
 Ben Masters as Detective Mike Fisher
 Glynnis O'Connor as Cas Richter
 M. Emmet Walsh as Detective Sam Davies
 John Ashton as Detective Roger Dunn
 Bonnie Bartlett as Louise Bundy
 Billy "Green" Bush as Officer Bradley
 Frederick Coffin as Jerry Thompson
 Deborah Goodrich as Martha Chambers
 Lawrence Pressman as Ken Wolverton
 Macon McCalman as Larsen's Editor
 Jeannetta Arnette as Barbara 
 William Boyett as Aspen Detective
 Harry Northup as Tom Hargreaves

Broadcast technical difficulties 
During the second part's broadcast, a few NBC affiliates (including WPXI channel 11 Pittsburgh, Pennsylvania and KPRC channel 2 Houston, Texas) were interrupted by a frozen scene and a static sound until placing their own technical difficulties tel-op graphics for less than 30 seconds before returning to its fixed program.

Reception 

Bundy's lawyer Polly Nelson, in her book Defending the Devil, characterized the film as "stunningly accurate" and said it did not portray anything that was not proven to be factual. She singled out praise for Harmon's portrayal of Bundy, noting how Harmon reproduced Bundy's rigid posture and suspicious expression. According to Nelson, her client, still on death row when the program aired, showed no interest in seeing the film.

Ann Rule, who had known Bundy before the murders when they worked together on a suicide crisis hotline (Jeannetta Arnette played a character based on Rule), felt that Harmon's portrayal missed the insecurities that lurked under Bundy's confident facade. Harmon was nominated for a Golden Globe for his portrayal of Bundy.

According to The New York Times, the two shows ranked seventeenth and sixth in the Nielsen ratings. Howard Rosenberg of the Los Angeles Times described it as "taut, suspenseful, scary".

References

External links 
 

1980 non-fiction books
1986 films
1980s crime drama films
American biographical films
American crime drama films
American television miniseries
American television films
Films directed by Marvin J. Chomsky
Films set in the 1970s
Non-fiction books about Ted Bundy
Crime films based on actual events
Films scored by Gil Mellé
Films about Ted Bundy
Films shot in Utah
Films shot in Washington (state)
1986 drama films
1980s American films